Toby Wallace (born 6 June 1995) is a British-born Australian actor, known for his role in Babyteeth (2019), for which he won the Marcello Mastroianni Award at the 2019 Venice Film Festival and the AACTA for Best Actor in a Leading Role in 2020.

Early life and education
Wallace was born in the United Kingdom on  6 June 1995, living there until he was aged eight. After the family moved to Australia, he went to Jells Park Primary School in the Melbourne suburb of Wheelers Hill until Year 6, before transferring to  Caulfield Grammar School, where he trained in drama and theatre.

Career
Wallace's first appearance in a feature film, aged 13, was in Lucky Country, a 2009 film by Australian filmmaker Kriv Stenders. It was for this role that he was nominated for an Australian Film Institute Award for Best Young Actor.

In 2012, Wallace had a role in the TV movie Underbelly Files: The Man Who Got Away. In 2012, Wallace played a month-long guest role in the long-running TV series Neighbours.

Wallace played the young Michael Hutchence in the miniseries about the rock band INXS, called INXS: Never Tear Us Apart, released in 2014.

Wallace played a leading role in the Australian feature Acute Misfortune, starring Daniel Henshall as the artist Adam Cullen and Wallace as his biographer, and was in the TV miniseries Romper Stomper, both released in 2018.

Wallace plays Steve Jones of the Sex Pistols, in the 2022 TV series Pistol, directed by Danny Boyle.

Filmography

Film

Television

Recognition
Wallace was nominated for an AFI Award for Best Young Actor in Lucky Country.

He won the Marcello Mastroianni Award at the 2019 Venice Film Festival and the AACTA for Best Actor in a Leading Role in 2020, for his role in Babyteeth.

References

External links

21st-century Australian male actors
Australian male film actors
Australian male television actors
Living people
Best Actor AACTA Award winners
1995 births
British emigrants to Australia
Male actors from Melbourne
People educated at Caulfield Grammar School